Joseph Patrick Monaghan (March 26, 1906 – July 4, 1985) of Butte, Montana was a U.S. Representative from Montana from 1933 to 1937. He was a Democrat. In 1936 he decided not to run for reelection and instead challenged Democratic incumbent United States senator James E. Murray in the Democratic primary. When Murray won, Monaghan ran in the general election as an independent. Murray soundly defeated Monaghan and Republican T.O. Larsen. Murray received 55% of the vote, Larsen 27% of the vote and Monaghan 18%. At the age of 30, Monaghan's political career came to an end. He returned to his law practice, and returned to politics only briefly in 1964 when he ran for the Democratic nomination unsuccessfully for the United States Senate in Montana, against Senate Majority leader Mike Mansfield.

References

External links

1906 births
1985 deaths
Politicians from Butte, Montana
Democratic Party members of the United States House of Representatives from Montana
Montana Independents
20th-century American politicians
Carroll College (Montana) alumni
Montana State University alumni